David Ugochukwu Nwaba    (born January 14, 1993) is an American professional basketball player for the Motor City Cruise of the NBA G League. He played college basketball for Santa Monica College and Cal Poly.

High school career
Nwaba attended University High School in Los Angeles, where he was a two-time All-Western League Most Valuable Player honoree and all-league first team selection. As a senior in 2010–11, he averaged 22.0 points and 11.5 rebounds per game.

College career
While initially joining Hawaii Pacific, Nwaba redshirted the 2011-12 season and transferred to Santa Monica College in 2012. In 2012–13, he was named Western State Conference South Division Player of the Year and to the All-California Community College Athletic Association state first team after averaging 20.5 points, 8.8 rebounds and 2.5 assists per game.

In 2013, Nwaba transferred again, this time to Cal Poly. As a sophomore in 2013–14, he appeared in all 34 games with 30 starts and finished eighth among Big West Conference players and 59th among NCAA Division I players with a team-leading 52.6 (140-for-266) field-goal percentage. He also finished second in the lineup with 11.7 points and 4.8 rebounds per game and 21 blocks. He was named to Big West All-Tournament Team after averaging 14.0 points and shooting 72.7 (16-for-22) percent from the floor in three contests. On December 14, 2013, he scored a career-high 22 points on 11-for-13 shooting against Cal State Dominguez Hills.

As a junior in 2014–15, Nwaba finished second in Cal Poly's lineup and 15th among Big West Conference players with 11.4 points per game. He also averaged 4.7 rebounds and had 31 steals at 1.3 per game. He recorded 16 double-digit scoring games, including a season-high 21 points against Gonzaga on December 20, 2014.

As a senior in 2015–16, Nwaba earned All-Big West Honorable Mention selection after averaging 12.5 points, 6.3 rebounds, 3.5 assists and 1.2 steals in 30 games. At the end of his Cal Poly career, Nwaba ranked 15th in program history in rebounds with a total of 465 and was one of 23 players to score more than 1,000 career points.

Professional career

Los Angeles D-Fenders (2016–2017)
After graduating from Cal Poly in spring 2016 with a sociology degree, Nwaba headed to Reno, Nevada, to try out for the NBA Development League's Reno Bighorns. The Bighorns were awarded his rights but later traded those rights to the Los Angeles D-Fenders on October 30, 2016. Nwaba joined the D-Fenders for training camp and made the opening-night roster.

Los Angeles Lakers (2017)
On February 28, 2017, Nwaba signed a 10-day contract with the Los Angeles Lakers. That night, Nwaba made his NBA debut in a 109–104 loss to the Charlotte Hornets, playing six minutes of fourth-quarter action. On March 11, 2017, he signed a second 10-day contract with the Lakers. He made his first start for the Lakers a day later, scoring six points in a 118–116 loss to the Philadelphia 76ers. On March 21, 2017, he signed a multi-year contract with the Lakers. On April 1, 2017, he scored 19 points in a 115–104 loss to the Los Angeles Clippers. During his rookie season with the Lakers, Nwaba was assigned back down to the D-Fenders four times. On July 12, 2017, he was waived by the Lakers.

Chicago Bulls (2017–2018)
On July 14, 2017, Nwaba was claimed off waivers by the Chicago Bulls. 
Early in the 2017 season, Nwaba entered the starting lineup multiple times and was lauded by his teammates for his ability to contest shots. On February 22, 2018, Nwaba scored a career-high 21 points against the Philadelphia 76ers.

Cleveland Cavaliers (2018–2019)

On September 8, 2018, Nwaba signed with the Cleveland Cavaliers.

Brooklyn Nets (2019–2020)
On July 17, 2019, Nwaba signed with the Brooklyn Nets. On December 19, Nwaba suffered a season-ending Achilles tear in a game against the San Antonio Spurs. On January 3, 2020, Nwaba was waived by the Nets.

Houston Rockets (2020–2022)
On June 23, 2020, Nwaba signed a two-year deal with the Houston Rockets.

On September 30, 2022, Nwaba was traded, along with Trey Burke, Sterling Brown, and Marquese Chriss, to the Oklahoma City Thunder in exchange for Derrick Favors, Ty Jerome, Maurice Harkless, Théo Maledon and a future second-round pick. On October 17, Nwaba was waived by the Thunder.

Motor City Cruise (2022–present)
On December 17, 2022, Nwaba was traded from the Lakeland Magic to the Motor City Cruise.

NBA career statistics

Regular season

|-
| style="text-align:left;"|
| style="text-align:left;"|L.A. Lakers
| 20 || 2 || 19.9 || .580 || .200 || .641 || 3.2 || .7 || .6 || .4 || 6.0
|-
| style="text-align:left;"|
| style="text-align:left;"|Chicago
| 70 || 21 || 23.5 || .478 || .346 || .655 || 4.7 || 1.5 || .8 || .4 || 7.9
|-
| style="text-align:left;"|
| style="text-align:left;"|Cleveland
| 51 || 14 || 19.3 || .481 || .320 || .682 || 3.2 || 1.1 || .7 || .3 || 6.5
|-
| style="text-align:left;"| 
| style="text-align:left;"|Brooklyn
| 20 || 0 || 13.4 || .521 || .429 || .667 || 2.3 || .4 || .6 || .6 || 5.2
|-
| style="text-align:left;"| 
| style="text-align:left;"|Houston
| 30 || 9 || 22.6 || .486 || .270 || .691 || 3.9 || 1.0 || 1.0 || .7 || 9.2
|-
| style="text-align:left;"| 
| style="text-align:left;"|Houston
| 46 || 4 || 13.2 || .483 || .306 || .716 || 3.3 || .8 || .6 || .4 || 5.1
|- class="sortbottom"
| style="text-align:center;" colspan="2"|Career
| 237 || 50 || 19.3 || .490 || .320 || .673 || 3.7 || 1.0 || .7 || .4 || 6.8

Personal life
Nwaba is the son of Theodore and Blessing Nwaba, both of whom are Nigerian of Igbo origin. He has 5 siblings: two brothers Victor and Alex, and 3 sisters Jane, Precious, and Barbara. Barbara is a professional heptathlete who competed at UC Santa Barbara, won the 2015 and 2016 National Championships title and competed in the 2016 Olympics.

References

External links

1993 births
Living people
African-American basketball players
American men's basketball players
American people of Igbo descent
American sportspeople of Nigerian descent
Basketball players from Los Angeles
Brooklyn Nets players
Cal Poly Mustangs men's basketball players
Chicago Bulls players
Cleveland Cavaliers players
Houston Rockets players
Los Angeles D-Fenders players
Los Angeles Lakers players
Santa Monica Corsairs men's basketball players
Shooting guards
Small forwards
Undrafted National Basketball Association players
University High School (Los Angeles) alumni
21st-century African-American sportspeople